Charles Fanshawe, 4th Viscount Fanshawe (1643-1710) was an Irish Peer and Member of the House of Commons. He was the third surviving son of Thomas Fanshawe, 1st Viscount Fanshawe and his second wife, Elizabeth Cockayne.

Career
In 1667, Fanshawe was involved in the peace talks ending the Second Anglo-Dutch War, which were held at Breda. 

He later received a commission, serving as a captain in the regiment of Lord Alington in 1678. From 1681-85 he was a diplomatic envoy to Portugal.

Political life
On 10 October 1687 he became the 4th Viscount Fanshawe of Dromore, succeeding his nephew, Evelyn Fanshawe, the 3rd Viscount Fanshawe.

As an Irish Peer, he was allowed to serve in the House of Commons of England.

In 1689, as a Tory, he represented the Mitchell in the Convention Parliament, which was called after the Glorious Revolution of 1688.  He refused to take an oath of loyalty to newly crowned King William III and Queen Mary II and as a result was removed from Parliament.

In 1692, Parliament declared him a Jacobite and he was briefly imprisoned in the Tower of London for high treason.

Death
Fanshawe died in his Suffolk home on 28 March 1710 and was buried in Ware.

He had no known children.  Upon his death, his younger brother, Simon Fanshawe, succeeded him as the 5th Viscount Fanshawe of Dromore.

Further reading
  Updated version online.

References 

1643 births
1710 deaths
Viscounts in the Peerage of Ireland
Members of the pre-1707 English Parliament for constituencies in Cornwall
English MPs 1689–1690
Fanshawe family